The 2019–20 Summit League men's basketball season began in October 2019 with practices, followed by the start of the 2019-20 NCAA Division I men's basketball season in early November. Conference play began in late December, and concludes on the final day of February 2020. The 2020 Summit League men's basketball tournament begins and concludes in early March 2020, and leads into the 2020 NCAA Division I men's basketball tournament.

Head coaches

Head Coach Changes

Head Coach Records
As of beginning of 2019–20 season.

Preseason

Preseason Conference Poll
The Summit League released a poll in early October, which was voted on by a panel of the 9 head coaches, sports information directors and select media members. With a majority of the 34 voters, North Dakota State was deemed the favorite.

Preseason All-Summit League teams
The Summit League released its preseason All-Summit League first team and second team. A Preseason Player of the Year was also announced, and automatically is gifted a spot on first team.

Regular season

Early Season Tournaments
Seven of the nine Summit League teams participated in early season event, which could be a multi-team event, or a tournament. The two teams who didn't participate in one of these tournaments were Oral Roberts and Western Illinois.

Summit League Challenges
The Summit League played in both the Summit League/WAC Challenge and the Big Sky/Summit Challenges. The games and results are as follows:

Big Sky/Summit Challenge

The Summit League won a total of 4 of the 8 games, therefore splitting the challenge.

Summit League/WAC Challenge
After last year's loss in the Summit League/WAC Challenge by a score of 6–3, the Summit League looked to win the challenge this year.

The Summit League won this year's Summit League/WAC Challenge, a total of 5 games to 3 games.

Player of the Week
Each Monday during the season, the Summit League offices chose one or maybe two players to be named Player of the Week.

Athlete of the Month
In addition to the player of week, the Summit League also announces an athlete of the month, across of all sports, but separated by gender. So far, two players have been given the honor: Tyler Hagedorn in November, Emmanuel Nzekwesi in December, and Tyler Hagedorn again in January.

Conference matrix
This table summarizes the head to head results of each team in the Summit League. Each team plays 16 games, a home and away against all teams. Updated through 2/7.

Postseason

Summit League Conference tournament

References